Jim Doman (April 8, 1949 – May 1992) was an American professional poker player who won two World Series of Poker bracelets in the 1980s.

His total lifetime tournament winnings exceeded $800,000.

WSOP Bracelets

Notes

American poker players
World Series of Poker bracelet winners
1949 births
1992 deaths